The IPSC Czech Handgun Championship is an IPSC level 3 championship held once a year by the Practical Shooting Association of the Czech Republic.

Champions 
The following is a list of current and previous champions.

Overall category

Lady category

Junior category

Senior category

See also 
IPSC Czech Rifle Championship
IPSC Czech Shotgun Championship

References 

Match Results - 2003 Czech Handgun Championship
Match Results - 2004 Czech Handgun Championship
Match Results - 2005 Czech Handgun Championship
Match Results - 2006 Czech Handgun Championship

IPSC shooting competitions
National shooting championships
Shooting competitions in the Czech Republic
Handgun